The Bob Graham Round is a fell running challenge in the English Lake District. It is named after Bob Graham (1889–1966), a Keswick guest-house owner, who in June 1932 broke the Lakeland Fell record by traversing 42 fells within a 24-hour period.  Traversing the 42 fells, starting and finishing at Keswick Moot Hall, involves  66 miles (106 km) with 26,900 feet (8,200 m) of ascent.

The Round was first repeated, in a better time, in 1960 by Alan Heaton. Since then over 2700 individuals have completed the Round with the fastest time being 12hr 23m set by Jack Kuenzle in 2022, surpassing Kílian Jornet's record  by almost 30 minutes. The women's record is 14hr 34m set by Beth Pascall in 2020. The Lakeland 24 Hour record has also been improved with the current holder, Kim Collison, successfully reaching 78 summits in the allotted time.

Along with the Paddy Buckley Round and the Ramsay Round, the Bob Graham Round is one of the classic big three mountain challenges in the UK. Some fifty-six individuals have completed all three.

History of the round

Early developments 
The development of progressively lengthier and more competitive rounds of the Lakeland fells is chronicled in the Bob Graham Club's Story of the Bob Graham Round, and in the fell-walking section of M. J. B. Baddeley's Lakeland guidebook:, and most recently in Chapter 15 of Steve Chilton's It's a hill, get over it: fell running's history and characters 

Some of the more notable rounds:

 1864: the Reverend J.M. Elliott of Cambridge traversed the summits around the head of Wasdale in 8.5 hours
 1905: Dr Wakefield of Keswick completed the same round in 22h7m (recorded in The Sedberghian)
 1920: Eustace Thomas, at age 54, covered the same round in 21h25m

It was Dr Wakefield who codified the essentials of the challenge: "To traverse on foot as many tops over 2000ft and return to the starting point within 24 hours". Wakefield was Keswick-based so specified the start/finish point as that town's Moot Hall.

Bob Graham's initial Round 
On 12–13 June 1932 Bob Graham extended the 24-hour  Lakeland peak bagging record to a total of 42 peaks in a time of 23 hours 39 minutes. Even though this was recognised as the new record, several of the tops claimed did not reach  in altitude. At the time the distance was claimed (not by Graham) to be in excess of  though the given amount of ascent was reasonably close to the currently accepted figure. Several 20th Century sources (including the 42 Peaks booklet) erroneously state the distance to be .

It has long been thought that Bob Graham chose 42 peaks to match his age at the time of the attempt but his birth certificate shows that he was born on 1 March 1889 and therefore 43 at the time of his Round. It's possible that this was the original reasoning for his attempt the previous year.

The date of the successful round is sometimes given as 13–14 June 1932.  However this date would be Monday-Tuesday which is unlikely given that both he and his pacers would have had to take the Monday off work.

The record came under immediate scrutiny, possibly because Graham wasn't from the higher social classes who up until that time had been the only ones with the free time to spend long periods on the fells but more likely due to the large reported distance.

The first repeat 
The first attempt at beating the record came from Freddie Spencer Chapman who managed the round in 25 hours. As far as is known, this was the only attempt until after the Second World War. The next attempts were not until the 1950s with some coming close to success.

In the early 1960s, at a time when the veteran walker Dr Barbara Moore  was gaining publicity for doing the John o'Groats to Land's End walk, the Lakeland writer Harry Griffin noted that "You didn't need fitness for such walks, you could get fit whilst undertaking the challenge. The Lakeland 24 hour record on the other hand." This piqued the interest of several runners: Maurice Collett and Paul Stewart made an attempt starting from Langdale but experiencing rough weather they completed the round in 27 hours 20 minutes. Also interested were the Heaton brothers from Lancashire who systematically set about attempting the record.

After several attempts Alan Heaton finally broke the record in 1960, completing the circuit in 22 hours 18 minutes. 

Bob Graham's original round included four tops that are not in what is now called the Bob Graham Round. These were:

 High White Stones (an area just to the north of High Raise)
 Hanging Knotts (a subsidiary summit of Bowfell)
 Looking Stead (a prominence on the ridge between Pillar and Black Sail Pass)
 High Snab Bank (a minor prominence on the ridge to the north of Robinson)

Alan Heaton replaced these with:

 White Side
 Helvellyn Lower Man
 Ill Crag
 Broad Crag

Graham must have passed over the first two as they lie on the main path along the Helvellyn ridge.

It is these along with the other 38 tops that is now called the "Bob Graham Round" and are listed below.

Subsequent developments 
Heaton's new record began a flurry of activity to add extra tops with the intent of extending the 24-hour record. It was soon discovered that the route of Bob Graham's round was not optimal for attempts on the absolute fell record so the two began to be regarded as separate challenges and have slightly different rules. The 24-hour record has now been extended to 78 tops. Bob Graham's round was left as a challenge in its own right.

The Bob Graham Round is now a standard fell-runner's test-piece having been successfully completed by 2713 people up to the end of 2022.  Solo rounds have been accomplished but most contenders are accompanied by at least one runner in support, a requirement for acceptance of membership of the Bob Graham Club. The vast majority of attempts are undertaken close to mid summer to make use of maximum daylight.  Nonetheless, as of December 2022, fifty individuals have successfully completed a winter round of the standard circuit.

The route 

The round may be attempted either clockwise or anti-clockwise, provided that the start and finish is at the Moot Hall, Keswick. Predicted times for each stage of the round can be determined using an adaptation of Naismith's rule.

Record circuits

The succession of fastest rounds by men for the standard 42 tops is:
 1960: Alan Heaton – 22:18
 1971: Peter Walkington – 20:43
 1973: Bill Smith & Boyd Millen – 20:38
 1976: John North – 19:48
 1976: Billy Bland – 18:50
 1977: Mike Nicholson – 17:45
 1982: Billy Bland – 13:53
 2018: Kílian Jornet - 12:52
 2022: Jack Kuenzle - 12:23

The progression of fastest ladies' rounds is:
 1977: Jean Dawes - 23:27
 1978: Anne-Marie Grindley - 21:05
 1979: Ros Coats - 20:31
 1988: Helene Diamantides - 20:17
 1989: Helene Diamantides - 19:11
 1991: Anne Stentiford - 18:49
 2012: Nicky Spinks - 18:12
 2015: Nicky Spinks – 18:06
 2016: Jasmin Paris - 15:24
 2020: Beth Pascall - 14:34

The progression of these record times is shown in the graph.

Building on the basic Bob Graham Round, later runners raised the number of peaks traversed within 24 hours still further:

 1962: Alan Heaton – 54 peaks in 23:48
 1964: Alan Heaton – 60 peaks in 23:34
 1971: Joss Naylor – 61 peaks in 23:37
 1972: Joss Naylor – 63 peaks in 23:35
 1988: Mark McDermott – 76 peaks in 23:26
 1997: Mark Hartell – 77 peaks in 23:47
 2020: Kim Collison – 78 peaks in 23:45

The sequence of ladies 24-hour records (for the number of peaks traversed within 24 hours or for the same number of peaks in a faster time) is:
1977: Jean Dawes – 42 peaks in 23:37
1978: Anne-Marie Grindley – 42 peaks in 21:05
1979: Ros Coats – 42 peaks in 20:31
1979: Anne-Marie Grindley – 58 peaks in 23:20
1994: Ann Stentiford – 62 peaks in 23:17
2011: Nicky Spinks – 64 peaks in 23:15
2020: Carol Morgan - 65 peaks in 23:57
2021: Nicky Spinks - 65 peaks in 23:45
2022: Fiona Pascall - 68 peaks in 23:26

The progression of the record for the number of peaks is shown in the graph.

Several later runners have successfully attempted 50 peaks at 50, and 55 peaks at 55. Notable achievements are:
 1997: Joss Naylor attempted 60 peaks at age 60 over 36 hours (first to last peak) to raise money for Multiple Sclerosis research
 2005: Yiannis Tridimas completed 60 peaks at age 60, in 23:52
 2006: Joss Naylor completed 70 peaks at age 70, covering more than 50 miles and ascending more than 25,000 feet, in under 21 hours

Double Rounds 
A double round is two rounds (132 miles and 54,000 feet of climbing) on consecutive days. This has been achieved eight times, three times within 48 hours, with the record held by Dougie Zinis.

 1977: Boyd Millen - 52:30
 1979: Roger Baumeister - 46:34
 1995: Eric Draper - 50:35
 2016 May 14/15: Nicky Spinks - 45:30
 2018: Tom Hollins - 52:30
 2019 August 24/26: Stuart Walker - 51:18
 2020 August 1/3 Gwynne Stokes - 54:30
 2021 September 10/11: Dougie Zinis - 45:03

Baumeister and Spinks both started at Keswick, ran clockwise to Yewbarrow (peak 31 on a clockwise Round), reversed and ran back to Keswick, then continued anticlockwise to Yewbarrow (now peak 12 on an anticlockwise Round), before reversing again and completing the double traverse of all 42 peaks, once clockwise and once anticlockwise, at Keswick.

The Bob Graham Club 24 Hour Club

The Bob Graham Club was proposed in 1971 by Fred Rogerson. It exists to record attempts at long distance challenges over the Lakeland fells. The majority of the club's activity is related to the Bob Graham Round itself. While there is no requirement for those attempting the round to apply for membership most do so. The Club does not organise attempts on the Round, this is left to each individual.

The rules for gaining club membership are simple:

 Starting at the Moot Hall in Keswick, traverse the 42 summits of the Round (or more) on foot and return to the starting point within 24 hours of the starting time.
 The visit to each summit must be witnessed by a companion and the time of that visit recorded.
 The times at each summit and names of companions are entered in the membership application form.

The second requirement effectively prevents solo rounds counting for club membership though several runners, both club members and non-members, have made solo rounds.

The club decided that from 1 January 2020, they will no longer accept rounds that use paid-for or commercial guiding services, in keeping with the ethos of the club of voluntary and mutual support.

See also
South Wales Traverse
Paddy Buckley Round A similar round in the mountains of Snowdonia.
Ramsay Round The Scottish equivalent of the Bob Graham taking in 24 Munros on the ridges of The Grey Corries and the Mamores.
Wicklow Round The eastern Irish equivalent, taking in 26 mountains in the Wicklow Mountains.
Denis Rankin Round The Northern Irish equivalent, taking in the Mourne Mountains.
The Lakes Classic Rock Round - A round that includes 1300 m of rock climbing.

References

External links 
 Bob Graham 24 Hour Club Official site of the Bob Graham Round club
 Bob Graham Round Bob Wightman's Bob Graham Round webpages
 The Bob Graham Round Another site for enthusiasts including further statistics (now part of the Bob Graham 24 Hour Club's website)
 Fell & Rock Climbing Club of the English Lake District FRCC site, giving long walks and runs in the English Lakes
 The Fell Runners Association organizers in the UK with links to regions, events and clubs
 The Bob Graham Round Photo Blog | Calum Lewis A Photographic Journal of the Bob Graham Round 2016

Fell running challenges
Sport in Cumbria